Jan Stępczak (born 29 August 1944) is a Polish former football player and manager who played as a defender.

References

1944 births
Living people
People from Leszno
Polish footballers
Association football defenders
Lech Poznań players
Ekstraklasa players
Polish football managers
GKS Bełchatów managers
Lech Poznań managers
Dyskobolia Grodzisk Wielkopolski managers